Travelling Man is a compilation album by the progressive rock group Caravan made of following albums: Cool Water (1994), The Battle of Hastings (1995) and All Over You (1997), except for track 8 which is taken from the very first album Caravan (1968).

Track listing

Personnel 

 Pye Hastings – accordionist, electric guitarist, vocalist, harmony vocalist, Leslie guitarist
 Jim Leverton – bass guitarist, vocalist, harmony vocalist
 Geoff Richardson – acoustic guitarist, clarinet, mandolin, violinist, accordion, electric guitarist, tambourine, violist, wind, kalimba, harmony vocals, shaker, amplifiers
 Dave Sinclair – keyboards, harmony vocalist
 Richard Coughlan – drums

Additional personnel
 Jimmy Hastings – clarinet, flute, alto flute, bass flute, piccolo, soprano sax, tenor sax

References

External links
  
 
 Caravan - Travelling Man (1998) compilation album credits & releases at AllMusic.com
 Caravan - Travelling Man (1998) compilation album releases & credits at Discogs.com
 Caravan - Travelling Man (1998) compilation album to be listened as stream at Play.Spotify.com

Caravan (band) live albums
1998 live albums